Rustom-E-Baghdad is a 1963 Bollywood drama film directed by B.J. Patel.

Cast
 Dara Singh
 Chandrashekhar
 Vijaya Chowdhury
 Shakila Bano Bhopali
 Paulson
 Devichand
 Rajan Kapoor

Soundtrack
All songs were written by Asad Bhopali.

External links

References

1963 films
1960s Hindi-language films
Films scored by Datta Naik
Films set in Baghdad